Isaac Mensah (born 7 February 2002) is a Ghanaian professional footballer who plays as a forward for Ghanaian Premier league side Accra Hearts of Oak.

Career 
Mensah started his career with youth side Royals SC at Konongo in the Ashanti region. He later moved to Ghana Division One League side Nkoranza Warriors. Before the leagues in Ghana were truncated due to the COVID-19 pandemic,he had scored 8 goals including scoring 4 goals in match against Yendi Gbewaa FC.  He moved to Hearts of Oak in July 2020 ahead of the 2020–21 Ghana Premier League season. As at 7 March 2021, he had scored 3 goals in the league.

Honours 
Hearts of Oak

 Ghana Premier League: 2020–21
Ghanaian FA Cup: 2021

References

External links 

 

Living people
2002 births
Ghanaian footballers
Ghana Premier League players
Association football forwards